Laurent Recouderc was the defending champion, but he chose not to compete this year.Pere Riba won in the final 6–0, 6–3 against Facundo Bagnis.

Seeds

Draw

Finals

Top half

Bottom half

References
Main Draw
Qualifying Singles

ZRE Katowice Bytom Open - Singles
ZRE Katowice Bytom Open